Fun is a 1994 Canadian independent drama film starring Alicia Witt and Renée Humphrey, and directed by Rafal Zielinski. Both Witt and Humphrey won a Special Jury Recognition award at the 1994 Sundance Film Festival. The film centers on the murder of an elderly woman by two mentally unstable girls. The film is based on a play by James Bosley, which was in turn based on an actual murder that was committed in Auburn, California in 1983 by 14-year-old Shirley Wolf and 15-year-old Cindy Collier. The film's title is derived from a diary entry by Wolf, which read: "Today, Cindy and I ran away and killed an old lady. It was lots of fun."

Plot
The film is told in flashbacks detailing the girls' relationship (in color), and their time in juvenile detention center (in black and white). Bonnie, aged 14, and Hillary, aged 15, meet at a bus stop in Los Angeles, California, and begin a friendship. They stroll around their city, chuck rocks onto a highway from an overpass bridge, run rampant in shopping malls, and play video games.

Their day escalates into an eruption of violence and rage when they brutally stab an elderly woman to death. They then run to a gas station and attempt to wash off the blood from their clothes. After their arrest, they claim that the murder was purely just for "fun". The story moves from the juvenile detention center where the girls are kept, to the girls on the day of the killing.

Cast
Renée Humphrey as Hillary
Alicia Witt as Bonnie
William R. Moses as John 
Leslie Hope as Jane
Ania Suli as Mrs. Farmer

References

External links

1994 crime drama films
1994 films
1990s teen films
Canadian crime drama films
English-language Canadian films
Films directed by Rafal Zielinski
Films set in Los Angeles
Teensploitation
Films about murder
Canadian films based on plays
1990s English-language films
1990s Canadian films

Canadian independent films
1994 independent films
Sundance Film Festival award winners